Real Love  is the eighth studio album by German recording artist Sarah Connor. It was released by X-Cell Records, a division of the Universal Music Group, on October 22, 2010 in German-speaking Europe. Connor's first album in two years, it involves production by Alexander Geringas, Robin Grubert, Michelle Leonard, and Erik Lewander as well as her frequent contributors Kay Denar and Rob Tyger.

Released to a lukewarm reception by critics, the album debuted at number eight on the German Albums Chart and reached number fifteen and twenty-two in Austria and Switzerland respectively. Altogether, Real Love produced two singles, including "Cold as Ice," which reached the top twenty on the German Singles Chart, and its title track.

Track listing

Charts

Release history

References

External links
 SarahConnor.com — official site

2010 albums
Sarah Connor (singer) albums